Bojana Bobusic and Christina Fusano were the defending champions, but both chose not to participate. 
Tamaryn Hendler and Chichi Scholl defeated Lindsay Lee-Waters and Megan Moulton-Levy, 7–6(11–9), 3–6, [10–7].

Seeds

Draw

Draw

References
 Main Draw

Fifth Third Bank Tennis Championships - Doubles
2011 WD
Fifth Third Bank Tennis Championships – Women's Doubles